KMJS Gabi ng Lagim is an annual Halloween television special of GMA Network's news magazine show Kapuso Mo, Jessica Soho, featuring urban legends, horror, and supernatural stories from around the Philippines. It first aired on October 27, 2013, and has since been present annually, usually on the Sunday closest to Undás.

Background 
Kapuso Mo, Jessica Soho has been airing Halloween specials under different titles on the years prior, before GMA Public Affairs Asstant Vice President Lee Joseph Castel suggested in 2012 to create an annual special under one name. It later became the Gabi ng Lagim.

On each edition, the special features three to four real-life accounts with interviews with the actual people, actual photos, videos, and audios of the supernatural encounters, which made it one of the talked about shows in the Philippines during Halloween season online. In 2018, it was reported that the show generated 80,000 tweets in 3 hours.

A number of stories featured on Gabi ng Lagim was also made into full feature film, including "Sanib" by Derick Cabrido from Gabi ng Lagim IV which was made into movie "Clarita" in 2019, and "Junjun" also by Cabrido from Gabi ng Lagim V into 2019 Carlo Ledesma film "Sunod".

Editions

References 

Filipino-language television shows
GMA Network original programming
GMA Integrated News and Public Affairs shows
Philippine documentary television series
GMA Network television specials
Halloween television specials